Bajramovci  is a village in the municipality of Kupres, Bosnia and Herzegovina.

Demographics 
According to the 2013 census, its population was 12, all Serbs.

References

Populated places in Kupres
Serb communities in the Federation of Bosnia and Herzegovina